Typhoon Faxai, known in Japan as , was the first typhoon to strike the Kantō region since Mindulle in 2016, and the strongest typhoon to hit the region since Ma-on in 2004. It was also the worst to hit the region since Talas in 2011, until the region was hit by more destructive Typhoon Hagibis less than a month later. Forming as the fifteenth named storm of the 2019 Pacific typhoon season, the precursor to Faxai was first noted as a weak tropical depression to the east of the International Dateline on August 29. The depression then entered the West Pacific basin on August 30. After moving in a general westward direction, the system strengthened into a named tropical storm by September 5. Faxai then strengthened into the sixth typhoon of the season the next day. Two days later, Faxai reached its peak strength as a Category 4 typhoon just before making landfall in mainland Japan. Turning northeastward, Faxai rapidly weakened and became extratropical on September 10.

Three people were killed and 147 others were injured. More than 390,000 people were urged to be evacuated. Faxai left 934,000 households without power. Train services in JR East were cancelled due to the storm. Two people died from heatstroke because of the power outage. Total loss in Japan were finalized at US$10 billion.

Meteorological history

At 18:00 UTC on August 29, a tropical depression formed just east of the International Date Line. It moved west across the Pacific Ocean the next day. It was then designated 14W by the Joint Typhoon Warning Center after they initiated advisories. By September 2, the JTWC upgraded 14W to a tropical storm, and maintained its intensity for a couple of days. Three days later, the Japan Meteorological Agency finally upgraded the system to a tropical storm, and named it Faxai. Faxai gradually intensified, reaching typhoon status on September 6. Typhoon Faxai rapidly intensified into a Category 4 storm on September 8 and reaching its peak intensity. Faxai weakened slightly before making landfall in Chichijima Island near Chiba City shortly before 5:00 a.m. JST September 9.

Preparations

Japan Railway system was suspended with the bullet trains stopped between Tokyo and Odawara. People began leaving by plane as Faxai continued approaching the coast of Japan. On Sunday all trains and flights were suspended with major winds and heavy rain expected to hit Tokyo. According to the Japan Meteorological Agency the storm would reach 134 mph winds when it made landfall. It was said that as much as 300 millimeters of rain could be recorded in Tokyo. Many homes and businesses were boarded up or secured by people across the country. Power was cut to people before the storm hit on Sunday. 13,300 customers at the Narita International Airport were trapped in the airport overnight. Both railways towards the city center were shut down. Passengers were forced to stay inside the airport. The airport handed out 18,000 sets of water and other utensils to customers at the airport. Highways were closed across Japan because of Faxai. U.S. bases had recovery teams ready for action after Faxai made landfall. Airbases all set closures the latest one being a base at the shoreline of Tokyo Bay at 11:15 am on September 9.

Impact

In Tokyo, beach homes had their windows and doors blown out by the storm. Two transmission towers were destroyed which left 100,000 homes and businesses without signal. A blackout across Japan left a Sony Corp, factory to shut down. The blackout stretched across the city of Tokyo with the Tokyo Electric Power Company saying that 730,000 households were without power.
Winds caused damage across the area of Honshu damaging homes, knocking out power and uprooting trees. It was recorded that between 3 and 8 inches of rain fell in southeastern Honshu causing minor flooding in the area. It was said that a landslide could be triggered by Faxai, but no landslide had been reported. Faxai was linked to three deaths and a dozen injuries in Japan alone, with more than 850,000 customers without power. Fires were reported at a solar power plant after Faxai and across the Chiba Prefecture farmlands being flooded due to heavy rain across Japan. People were toppled by large wind gusts during the storm with the eyewall passing over Japan damaging many areas. A woman was killed when she was toppled by a wind gust. Transportation systems were closed when Faxai blasted the area.

Faxai was recorded as one of the most powerful typhoons to impact Tokyo, with 134 mph winds being recorded in Tokyo. The Tokyo Bay grew by a few inches because of the heavy rainfall total that Faxai dropped. Metal signs were torn off of buildings, trucks were knocked down or overturned, a gas station was destroyed and a glass case was also destroyed leaving broken glass scattered through streets. Television footage showed a huge roof collapsing at a petrol station in Tateyama.

Aftermath and retirement

Due to the severe impact in Japan, the name Faxai was retired during the 52nd annual session of the ESCAP/WMO Typhoon Committee in February 2020. In February 2021, the Typhoon Committee subsequently chose Nongfa as its replacement name.

See also

Weather of 2019
Tropical cyclones in 2019
Typhoon Mindulle (2016)
Typhoon Ma-on (2004)
Typhoon Oscar
Typhoon Ida (1958)
Typhoon Hagibis

References

External links

Tropical Cyclone Information of Typhoon Faxai (1915) from the Japan Meteorological Agency
Joint Typhoon Warning Center

15W.FAXAI from the U.S. Naval Research Laboratory

2019 Pacific typhoon season
2019 in Japan
Typhoons
Typhoons in Japan
Tropical cyclones in 2019